The 2017 IIHF Women's Challenge Cup of Asia is an international women's ice hockey tournament run by the International Ice Hockey Federation. The tournament took place from 7 to 15 March 2017 at the Rink Ice Arena of the CentralPlaza Grand Rama IX in Bangkok, Thailand. A round robin format was used. It was the fifth edition held since its formation in 2010 under the IIHF Challenge Cup of Asia series of tournament.

The Philippines made their international debut in this tournament while India recorded their first international win against the former in this edition. New Zealand sent their under-18 national team.

Round robin

Fixtures
All times are local. (ICT – UTC+7)

Awards and statistics

Awards

Best Players Selected by the Directorate

 Best Goalkeeper  Maria Jessica Cabili

 Best Defenceman  Mei Wah Wan

 Best Forward  Wen Lin Lim

Source: IIHF.com

Best Players of Each Team Selected by Coaches

 India  Diskit Chhonzom Angmo

 Malaysia  Su Ying Karen Chong

 New Zealand U18  Jana Kivell

 Philippines  Maria Jessica Cabili

 Singapore  Jill Quek

 Thailand  Sirikarn Jittresin

 United Arab Emirates  Mariam Almazrouei

Source: IIHF.com

Scoring leaders

Source: IIHF.com

Goaltending leaders
Only the top five goaltenders, based on save percentage, who have played at least 40% of their team's minutes, are included in this list.

Source: IIHF.com

References

External links
Tournament page at IIHF.com

IIHF Women's Challenge Cup of Asia
IIHF Women's Challenge Cup of Asia
IIHF Women's Challenge Cup of Asia